National City station is a former railway station in National City, California. The California Southern Railroad, a subsidiary of the Atchison, Topeka and Santa Fe Railway, chose National City as the West Coast base of operations at the terminus of their planned transcontinental railroad.

History
The station building was built in 1882, following construction of a rail yard the previous year. On November 14, 1885, the first transcontinental passenger train departed National City en route to the east coast. In 1889, Santa Fe moved their workshops and offices to San Bernardino and Los Angeles and operations significantly declined at National City. Passenger trains lasted until 1930 and the station served as a freight depot until the 1960s. It was subsequently used as a restaurant and office spaces. The building was restored to its original condition in 1997 by the San Diego Electric Railway Association, who opened it as a museum.

The station was listed on the National Register of Historic Places on April 18, 1996, as the Station and General Office, California Southern Railroad. It is also listed as a California Historical Landmark under the name National City Santa Fe Rail Depot.

References

External links

The National City Depot — via the San Diego Electric Railway Association

National City, California
Railway stations on the National Register of Historic Places in California
Railway stations in San Diego County, California
Railway stations in the United States opened in 1882
Railway stations closed in 1930
Former Atchison, Topeka and Santa Fe Railway stations in California
National Register of Historic Places in San Diego County, California
California Historical Landmarks